Midway is an unincorporated community in Greene County, Virginia. It lies at an elevation of 659 feet (201 m).

References

Unincorporated communities in Greene County, Virginia
Unincorporated communities in Virginia